Leslie Holdsworth Allen (21 June 1879 – 5 January 1964) was an Australian academic and poet. He was Professor of English at the Royal Military College, Duntroon, the senior lecturer of English and Latin at Canberra University College and chairman of the Literature Censorship Board.

Early life
Allen was born in Maryborough, Victoria, the second son of William Allen, a Congregational minister and the older brother of Sir Carleton Allen. He was eleven when his family moved to Sydney where he attended Newington College (1894–1899). He later attended the University of Sydney and the University of Leipzig.

Academic career
In 1911, Allen was appointed as a senior lecturer in classics and English at Sydney Teachers College. After his marriage in 1915 to Dora Bavin (sister of Sir Thomas Bavin, Lancelot Bavin and Major Cyril Bavin OBE) he became professor of English at the Royal Military College, Duntroon. During his tenue at Duntroon he produced plays for the Canberra Society of Arts and Literature and wrote poetry and children's verse. In 1931, he became the sole lecturer in English and classics at Canberra University College (now the Australian National University).

Censorship
Allen was appointed in 1933 as a member of the Commonwealth Book Censorship Advisory Committee. From 1937 he was chairman of the Literature Censorship Board.

Family life
His wife Dora was tubercular and she died in 1932 predeceased by their only son. On his death in Moruya, New South Wales, he was survived by his only daughter.

Honours
The Haydon-Allen Lecture Theatre is in part a memorial to his work at the Australian National University.

Publications
Gods and Wood-Things (1913)
Phaedra: and Other Poems (1921)
Araby: and Other Poems (1924)
Patria (1941)

Selected works
To our beloved dead (1922)

References

1879 births
1964 deaths
Australian Congregationalists
Australian people of English descent
People educated at Newington College

Australian poets